Aya Muqu (Quechua  aya corpse, muqu hill, "corpse hill", also spelled Aya Moqo) is an archaeological site in Peru. It was declared a National Cultural Heritage by Resolución Directoral in  2003.  Aya Muqu is in the Ayacucho Region, Lucanas Province, Chipao District.

References 

Archaeological sites in Peru
Archaeological sites in Ayacucho Region